Mecodema atuanui was described from a single male specimen collected in pitfall traps on Mount Auckland (Atuanui), Kaipara Region. It is a medium-length ground beetle that is related to Mecodema spiniferum, which is the only large-lengthed ground beetle species found in the Waitākere Ranges, Auckland, rather than the more geographically close species (M. dunnorum) to the east in Puhoi.

Diagnosis 
Distinguished from other North Island Mecodema species by having:

 a lobate labrum; 
 vertexal groove defined by punctures along the entire length; 
 elytral intervals 3 and 5 significantly broadened than otherintervals; 
 the distinctively narrow width of the apical portion of the penis lobe.

Description 
Length 24.9 mm, pronotal width 6.7 mm, elytral width 7.9 mm. Colour of entire body matte black, except coxae and legs dark reddish-brown.

Natural History

References 

atuanui
Beetles described in 2019